Franklin School may refer to:
 Franklin School (Boise, Idaho), listed on the NRHP in Idaho
 Franklin School (Jamestown, North Dakota), listed on the NRHP in North Dakota
 Franklin School (Lexington, Massachusetts), listed on the NRHP in Massachusetts
 Franklin School (Missoula, Montana)
 The Franklin School (New York, NY), a college prep school on Manhattan's Upper West Side, merged with the Dwight School in the 1990s
 Franklin School (Omaha, Nebraska), listed on the NRHP in Nebraska
 Franklin School (Phoenix, Arizona), listed on the National Register of Historic Places (NRHP) in Arizona
 Franklin School (St. Louis, Missouri), listed on the NRHP in Missouri
 Franklin School (Schenectady, New York), listed on the NRHP
 Franklin School (Washington, D.C.), NRHP-listed and a U.S. National Historic Landmark

See also
 Franklin Elementary School (disambiguation)
 Franklin High School (disambiguation)
 Franklin Middle School (disambiguation)